Aechmea costantinii is a plant species in the genus Aechmea. This species is endemic to  northeastern Brazil.

References

costantinii
Flora of Brazil
Plants described in 1916